Daniele Sarzi Puttini (born 8 June 1996) is an Italian footballer who plays as a defender for  club Triestina.

Career
He made his Serie B debut for Carpi on 30 May 2014 in a game against Juve Stabia.

On 22 September 2020, he signed a multi-year contract with Ascoli.

On 21 January 2021, he was loaned to Bari.

On 7 August 2021, he joined Messina on loan. On 23 January 2022, he moved on a new loan to Latina.

On 15 July 2022, Sarzi Puttini signed a two-year contract with Triestina.

Honours
Carpi
 Serie B: 2014–15

References

External links
 

1996 births
Living people
People from Correggio, Emilia-Romagna
Footballers from Emilia-Romagna
Italian footballers
Association football defenders
Serie B players
Serie C players
A.C. Carpi players
F.C. Südtirol players
Piacenza Calcio 1919 players
A.C. Cuneo 1905 players
Fermana F.C. players
Ascoli Calcio 1898 F.C. players
S.S.C. Bari players
A.C.R. Messina players
Latina Calcio 1932 players
U.S. Triestina Calcio 1918 players
Sportspeople from the Province of Reggio Emilia